Limbach-Oberfrohna is a town in the district of Zwickau in Saxony, Germany.

Main sights
 Schloss  (Castle) Wolkenburg
 Protestant church in Oberfrohna
 Wasserturm  ("Water Tower")
 Limbach Municipal Church

Town hall

The town hall was previously the manor house. It was acquired by Friedrich Ludwig Leuschner in 1863 and sold by Otto Leuschner to the municipality in 1911.

Economy
Limbach-Oberfrohna is situated in the manufacturing district of Chemnitz. It has a public park and a monument to the composer Johannes Pache. Its industries in the past included the making of worsteds, cloth, silk and sewing-machines, dyeing and bleaching. However, these industries collapsed almost completely after the reunification of Germany in 1990. Today, the biggest employers in the town are Siemens VDO, a former branch of the Siemens AG and manufacturer of car-supplies together with other mechanical-engineering firms.

Transport
The town is situated near the Bundesautobahn 4 and Bundesautobahn 72. Chemnitz, a city with a long existing mechanical-engineering-industry, is situated about 15 km to the east of Limbach-Oberfrohna.

Notable people 

 Siegfried Schnabl (born 1927), sexologist and psychotherapist

References 

Zwickau (district)